The Import of Live Fish (England and Wales) Act 1980 is an Act of Parliament which controls the release of non-indigenous species of fish, affording protection to native species of fish within the boundaries of England or Wales.

It is an offence (unless under a granted licence), to import, keep or release, of any live fish or shellfish (or their eggs), of a species  (not native to England and Wales) and which may threaten the ecosystem or habitat of any indigenous freshwater or migrating fish, or shellfish in England and Wales.

Not holding a licence or failing to comply with the licence requirements will result in a possible conviction and the destruction of the non-indigenous animals.

References 

Acts of the Parliament of the United Kingdom concerning England and Wales
United Kingdom Acts of Parliament 1980
Animal welfare and rights legislation in the United Kingdom
Import